Champereia is a genus of plants in the family Opiliaceae described as a genus in 1843.

It contains only one known species, Champereia manillana, native to China (Guangxi, Yunnan), Taiwan, Southeast Asia, New Guinea, and Christmas Island.

Varieties
 Champereia manillana var. longistaminea (W.Z.Li) H.S.Kiu - Yunnan, Guangxi
 Champereia manillana var. manillana - Taiwan, Southeast Asia, New Guinea, and Christmas Island

References

Opiliaceae
Monotypic Santalales genera